The 2020–21 Melbourne Stars Women's season was the sixth in the team's history. Coached by Trent Woodhill and captained by Meg Lanning, the Stars were runners-up of WBBL06. Playing the entirety of the tournament in a bio-secure Sydney hub due to the COVID-19 pandemic, they finished the regular season on top of the points table. It was therefore the first time the Stars managed to qualify for the finals—a breakthrough especially notable after ending WBBL05 in last place.

Despite a dramatic improvement to the team's overall performance from previous seasons, the Stars' campaign nevertheless ended on a sour note: In the championship decider, held at North Sydney Oval, they were dealt a "thumping" upset defeat at the hands of the Sydney Thunder, losing by seven wickets with 38 balls remaining.

Squad 
Each 2020–21 squad is to be made up of 15 active players. Teams can sign up to five 'marquee players', with a maximum of three of those from overseas. Marquees are classed as any overseas player, or a local player who holds a Cricket Australia national contract at the start of the WBBL|06 signing period.

Personnel changes made ahead of the season included:

 Former Australian player and Stars captain Kristen Beams retired from cricket at the end of WBBL|05.
 Head coach David Hemp parted ways with the Stars and was initially replaced by Leah Poulton. However, a month after her appointment, Poulton resigned from the position to undertake the role of Head of Female Cricket at Cricket NSW. The Stars then announced Trent Woodhill would take over the top coaching job.
 Meg Lanning returned to the Stars, where she played the first two WBBL seasons before a three-year stint with the Perth Scorchers. Lanning also resumed her role as captain of the team, taking over from Elyse Villani.
 South Africa marquee Lizelle Lee signed with the Melbourne Renegades, bringing her three-year stay at the Stars to an end.
 England marquee Nat Sciver returned to the Stars, where she played the first two WBBL seasons before moving to the Perth Scorchers.
 England marquee Katherine Brunt signed with the Stars, marking her return to the league after playing in the first three WBBL seasons with the Perth Scorchers.
 Nicola Hancock departed the Stars, signing with the Brisbane Heat.
 Angela Reakes returned to the Sydney Sixers, where she played the first three WBBL seasons before a two-year stint with the Stars.
 Madeline Penna signed with the Adelaide Strikers, having played with the Stars in WBBL|05 as an injury replacement.
 Bhavisha Devchand signed with the Stars, having played with the Perth Scorchers in WBBL|04 as an injury replacement.

Changes made during the season included:
 New Zealand marquee Rosemary Mair was signed from the reserve player pool, replacing Katherine Brunt (managed) on 25 October and 17 November.
Anna Lanning was signed from the reserve player pool, replacing Georgia Gall (finger) for three games from 10 to 22 November.

The table below lists the Stars players and their key stats (including runs scored, batting strike rate, wickets taken, economy rate, catches and stumpings) for the season.

Ladder

Fixtures 
All times are local time

Regular season

Knockout phase

From the first over of the match, the Melbourne Stars top-order was dominated by a "fiery" spell from Sydney Thunder pace bowler Shabnim Ismail, who regularly beat the bat of Elyse Villani and created two catching opportunities against Meg Lanning before dismissing both players for scores of one and 13 respectively. After being dropped on zero by Tammy Beaumont at point, as well as surviving a half-chance which Sammy-Jo Johnson put down at third man, Lanning's seven-ball battle with Ismail came to an end when she edged a seaming delivery through to wicket-keeper Tahlia Wilson at the start of the seventh over. Thunder captain Rachael Haynes was praised for "sensing the moment" by taking the tactical risk of persisting with Ismail, leading to Lanning's wicket which several media outlets described as the defining moment of the match: writing for The Sydney Morning Herald, Tom Decent said "this was the Thunder's night about a quarter of an hour into the contest," while the Australian Associated Press suggested the "Stars' shot at a maiden title was realistically gone inside 37 balls."

Melbourne could not recover from their poor start to post a significant total, slumping further to 5/37 by the halfway mark of the first innings. Annabel Sutherland scored 20 from as many balls but, like Lanning, did not capitalise on two reprieves afforded to her by the Thunder's underwhelming performance in the field. Wickets continued to flow as every Sydney bowler picked up at least one each. Johnson, having opened the bowling with Ismail and proving similarly difficult to score against, finished with match-best figures of 2/11 off four overs which included claiming the wicket of Mignon du Preez via LBW during the powerplay. Katherine Brunt, ending the innings on 22 not out from 27 deliveries, ensured the Stars lasted the allotted 20 overs but their overall score of 9/86 was nevertheless the lowest-ever in a WBBL final.

In reply, Tammy Beaumont (16 off 15) and Rachel Trenaman (23 off 26) steadily opened the Thunder's innings, while experienced campaigners Heather Knight (26 not out) and Rachael Haynes (21 not out) completed the comfortable run chase through a flurry of boundaries. With a lofted drive over long-off that sailed for six, Knight hit the winning runs off the bowling of Alana King in the 14th over, clinching a seven-wicket victory with 38 balls remaining. The Sydney Thunder consequently claimed their second WBBL championship, having also won the inaugural title—only Haynes and Samantha Bates were members of both successful squads, the latter missing the WBBL|01 final due to a broken wrist injury sustained earlier in the tournament. The triumph also marked an individual three-peat for Sammy-Jo Johnson, who won the WBBL04 and WBBL05 titles with the Brisbane Heat before moving to the Thunder. Lauren Smith—making her fifth appearance in a WBBL final—earned a third Women's Big Bash League championship as well, having won the WBBL02 and WBBL03 titles with the Sydney Sixers.

A major talking point of the match surrounded the decision made by the Melbourne Stars at the bat flip. Stars captain Meg Lanning sent her own team in to bat first, a noticeable departure from the tactics she employed throughout the season. In fact, it was the first time a Lanning-led WBBL team would opt against chasing since the 2016–17 season. Explaining the shock choice, Lanning said: "We just thought our batting line-up was in really good form, and we thought we'd back ourselves in to get a decent score." Stars coach Trent Woodhill implied the decision was swayed by the Brisbane Heat's collapse under pressure two days earlier: "We also saw what happened with the Heat and the Thunder (semi-final) the other night." The following day, Woodhill added: "It was a sliding door moment. There's no regrets. It was a team decision."

Statistics and awards 
 Most runs: Meg Lanning – 493 (2nd in the league)
Highest score in an innings: Meg Lanning – 77 (59) vs Sydney Sixers, 22 November
Most wickets: Nat Sciver – 19 (equal 2nd in the league)
Best bowling figures in an innings: Nat Sciver – 4/29 (4 overs) vs Adelaide Strikers, 10 November
Most catches: Nat Sciver – 8 (equal 3rd in the league)
Player of the Match awards:
Meg Lanning, Nat Sciver – 3 each
Katherine Brunt, Alana King, Annabel Sutherland – 1 each
WBBL06 Player of the Tournament: Meg Lanning (2nd), Mignon du Preez (equal 5th), Nat Sciver (equal 5th)
WBBL06 Team of the Tournament: Alana King, Meg Lanning, Nat Sciver
Stars Player of the Season: Nat Sciver

References 

2020–21 Women's Big Bash League season by team
Melbourne Stars (WBBL)